

Events

Pre-1600
 506 – The bishops of Visigothic Gaul meet in the Council of Agde.
1419 – John the Fearless, Duke of Burgundy is assassinated by adherents of the Dauphin, the future Charles VII of France.
1509 – An earthquake known as "The Lesser Judgment Day" hits Constantinople.
1515 – Thomas Wolsey is invested as a Cardinal.
1547 – The Battle of Pinkie, the last full-scale military confrontation between England and Scotland, resulting in a decisive victory for the forces of Edward VI.
1561 – Fourth Battle of Kawanakajima: Takeda Shingen defeats Uesugi Kenshin in the climax of their ongoing conflicts.
1570 – Spanish Jesuit missionaries land in present-day Virginia to establish the short-lived Ajacán Mission.
1573 – German pirate Klein Henszlein and 33 of his crew are beheaded in Hamburg.

1601–1900
1607 – Edward Maria Wingfield ousted as first president of the governing council of the Colony of Virginia; he is replaced by John Ratcliffe.
1608 – John Smith is elected council president of Jamestown, Virginia.
1776 – American Revolutionary War: Nathan Hale volunteers to spy for the Continental Army.
1798 – At the Battle of St. George's Caye, British Honduras defeats Spain.
1813 – The United States defeats a British Fleet at the Battle of Lake Erie during the War of 1812.
1846 – Elias Howe is granted a patent for the sewing machine.
1858 – George Mary Searle discovers the asteroid 55 Pandora.
1897 – Lattimer massacre: A sheriff's posse kills 19 unarmed striking immigrant miners in Lattimer, Pennsylvania, United States.
1898 – Empress Elisabeth of Austria is assassinated by Luigi Lucheni.

1901–present
1918 – Russian Civil War: The Red Army captures Kazan.
1919 – The Republic of German-Austria signs the Treaty of Saint-Germain-en-Laye, ceding significant territories to Italy, Yugoslavia, and Czechoslovakia.
1932 – The New York City Subway's third competing subway system, the municipally-owned IND, is opened.
1936 – First World Individual Motorcycle Speedway Championship, Held at London's (England) Wembley Stadium
1937 – Nine nations attend the Nyon Conference to address international piracy in the Mediterranean Sea.
1939 – World War II: The submarine  is mistakenly sunk by the submarine  near Norway and becomes the Royal Navy's first loss of a submarine in the war.
  1939   – World War II: The Canadian declaration of war on Germany receives royal assent.
1942 – World War II: The British Army carries out an amphibious landing on Madagascar to re-launch Allied offensive operations in the Madagascar Campaign.
1943 – World War II: In the course of Operation Achse, German troops begin their occupation of Rome.
1960 – At the Summer Olympics in Rome, Abebe Bikila becomes the first sub-Saharan African to win a gold medal, winning the marathon in bare feet.
1961 – In the Italian Grand Prix, a crash causes the death of German Formula One driver Wolfgang von Trips and 15 spectators who are hit by his Ferrari, the deadliest accident in F1 history.
1967 – The people of Gibraltar vote to remain a British dependency rather than becoming part of Spain.
1974 – Guinea-Bissau gains independence from Portugal.
1976 – A British Airways Hawker Siddeley Trident and an Inex-Adria DC-9 collide near Zagreb, Yugoslavia, killing 176.
1977 – Hamida Djandoubi, convicted of torture and murder, is the last person to be executed by guillotine in France.
2000 – Operation Barras successfully frees six British soldiers held captive for over two weeks and contributes to the end of the Sierra Leone Civil War.
2001 – Antônio da Costa Santos, mayor of Campinas, Brazil is assassinated.
  2001   – During his appearance on the British TV game show Who Wants to be a Millionaire?, contestant Charles Ingram reaches the £1 million top prize, but it was later revealed that he had cheated to the top prize by listening to coughs from his wife and another contestant.
2002 – Switzerland, traditionally a neutral country, becomes a full member of the United Nations.
2007 – Former Prime Minister of Pakistan Nawaz Sharif returns to Pakistan after seven years in exile, following a military coup in October 1999.
2008 – The Large Hadron Collider at CERN, described as the biggest scientific experiment in history, is powered up in Geneva, Switzerland.
2017 – Hurricane Irma makes landfall on Cudjoe Key, Florida as a Category 4, after causing catastrophic damage throughout the Caribbean. Irma resulted in 134 deaths and $64.76 billion (2017 USD) in damage.
2022 – Death of Queen Elizabeth II: King Charles III is formally proclaimed as monarch at a meeting of the Accession Council in St James's Palace.

Births

Pre-1600
 877 – Eutychius, patriarch of Alexandria (d. 940)
 904 – Guo Wei, posthumously known as Emperor Taizu of Later Zhou
1423 – Eleanor, Princess of Asturias (d. 1425)
1487 – Pope Julius III (d. 1555)
1497 – Wolfgang Musculus, German theologian (d. 1563)
1550 – Alonso Pérez de Guzmán, 7th Duke of Medina Sidonia, Spanish general (d. 1615)
1547 – George I, Landgrave of Hesse-Darmstadt (d. 1596)
1561 – Hernando Arias de Saavedra, Paraguayan-Argentinian soldier and politician (d. 1634)
1588 – Nicholas Lanier, English singer-songwriter and lute player (d. 1666)

1601–1900
1624 – Thomas Sydenham, English physician and author (d. 1689)
1638 – Maria Theresa of Spain (d. 1683)
1659 – Henry Purcell, English organist and composer (d. 1695)
1714 – Niccolò Jommelli, Italian composer (d. 1774)
1753 – John Soane, English architect and academic, designed the Royal Academy and Freemasons' Hall (d. 1837)
1758 – Hannah Webster Foster, American author (d. 1840)
1786 – Nicolás Bravo, Mexican soldier and politician, 11th President of Mexico (d. 1854)
  1786   – William Mason, American surgeon and politician (d. 1860)
1788 – Jacques Boucher de Crèvecœur de Perthes, French archaeologist and author (d. 1868)
1793 – Harriet Arbuthnot, English diarist (d. 1834)
1801 – Marie Laveau, American voodoo practitioner (d. 1881)
1821 – William Jervois, English captain, engineer, and politician, 10th Governor of South Australia (d. 1897)
1836 – Joseph Wheeler, American general and politician (d. 1906)
1839 – Isaac K. Funk, American minister and publisher, co-founded Funk & Wagnalls (d. 1912)
  1839   – Charles Sanders Peirce, American mathematician, statistician, and philosopher (d. 1914)
1844 – Abel Hoadley, English-Australian candy maker, created the Violet Crumble (d. 1918)
1852 – Hans Niels Andersen, Danish businessman, founded the East Asiatic Company (d. 1937)
  1852   – Alice Brown Davis, American tribal chief (d. 1935)
1860 – Marianne von Werefkin, Russian-Swiss painter (d. 1938)
1864 – Carl Correns, German botanist and geneticist (d. 1933)
1866 – Jeppe Aakjær, Danish author and poet (d. 1930)
1871 – Charles Collett, English engineer (d. 1952)
1872 – Ranjitsinhji, Indian cricketer (d. 1933)
1874 – Mamie Dillard, African American educator, clubwoman and suffragist (d. 1954)
1875 – George Hewitt Myers, American forester and philanthropist (d. 1957)
1876 – Hugh D. McIntosh, Australian businessman (d. 1942)
1880 – Georgia Douglas Johnson, American poet and playwright (d. 1966)
  1880   – Laura Cornelius Kellogg, Native American activist (d. 1947)
1884 – Herbert Johanson, Estonian architect (d. 1964)
1885 – Johannes de Jong, Dutch cardinal (d. 1955)
  1885   – Carl Clinton Van Doren, American critic and biographer (d. 1950)
1886 – H.D., American poet, novelist, and memoirist (d. 1961)
1887 – Giovanni Gronchi, Italian soldier and politician, 3rd President of the Italian Republic (d. 1978)
  1887   – Kenneth Mason, English soldier and geographer (d. 1976)
  1887   – Govind Ballabh Pant, Indian lawyer and politician, 1st Chief Minister of Uttar Pradesh (d. 1961)
1888 – Israel Abramofsky, Russian-American painter (d. 1976)
1889 – Ivar Böhling, Finnish wrestler (d. 1929)
1890 – Bob Heffron, New Zealand-Australian miner and politician, 30th Premier of New South Wales (d. 1978)
  1890   – Elsa Schiaparelli, Italian-French fashion designer (d. 1973)
  1890   – Franz Werfel, Austrian-Bohemian author, poet, and playwright (d. 1945)
1892 – Arthur Compton, American physicist and academic, Nobel Prize laureate (d. 1962)
1894 – Alexander Dovzhenko, Soviet screenwriter/producer/director of Ukrainian origin (d. 1956)
1895 – Viswanatha Satyanarayana, Indian poet and author (d. 1976)
1896 – Adele Astaire, American actress and dancer (d. 1981)
  1896   – Robert Taschereau, Canadian lawyer, judge, and politician, 11th Chief Justice of Canada (d. 1970)
  1896   – Ye Ting, Chinese general (d. 1946)
1897 – Georges Bataille, French philosopher, novelist, and poet (d. 1962)
  1897   – Hilde Hildebrand, German actress and singer (d. 1976)
1898 – Bessie Love, American actress (d. 1986)
  1898   – Waldo Semon, American chemist and engineer (d. 1999)

1901–present
1903 – Cyril Connolly, English author and critic (d. 1974)
1904 – Honey Craven, American horse rider and manager (d. 2003)
  1904   – Max Shachtman, American theorist and politician (d. 1972)
1906 – Karl Wien, German geographer, academic, and mountaineer (d. 1937)
1907 – Alva R. Fitch, American general (d. 1989)
  1907   – Dorothy Hill, Australian geologist and palaeontologist (d. 1997)
1908 – Angus Bethune, Australian soldier and politician, 33rd Premier of Tasmania (d. 2004)
  1908   – Raymond Scott, American pianist, composer, and bandleader (d. 1994)
  1908   – Waldo Rudolph Wedel, American archaeologist and author (d. 1996)
1912 – Basappa Danappa Jatti, Indian lawyer and politician, 5th Vice President of India (d. 2002)
1913 – Lincoln Gordon, American academic and diplomat, United States Ambassador to Brazil (d. 2009)
1914 – Terence O'Neill, Baron O'Neill of the Maine, Anglo-Irish captain and politician, 4th Prime Minister of Northern Ireland (d. 1990)
  1914   – Robert Wise, American director and producer (d. 2005)
1915 – Edmond O'Brien, American actor (d. 1985)
1917 – Miguel Serrano, Chilean poet and diplomat (d. 2009)
1919 – Lex van Delden, Dutch composer (d. 1988)
1920 – Fabio Taglioni, Italian engineer (d. 2001)
1921 – Joann Lõssov, Estonian basketball player and coach (d. 2000)
  1921   – John W. Morris, American general (d. 2013)
1923 – Glen P. Robinson, American businessman, founded Scientific Atlanta (d. 2013)
1924 – Ted Kluszewski, American baseball player and coach (d. 1988)
  1924   – Boyd K. Packer, American educator and religious leader, 26th President of the Quorum of the Twelve Apostles (d. 2015)
1925 – Roy Brown, American singer-songwriter (d. 1981)
  1925   – Dick Lucas, English minister and cleric
  1925   – Boris Tchaikovsky, Russian pianist and composer (d. 1996)
1926 – Beryl Cook, English painter and illustrator (d. 2008)
1927 – Johnny Keating, Scottish trombonist, composer, and producer (d. 2015)
1928 – Roch Bolduc, Canadian civil servant and politician
  1928   – Walter Ralston Martin, American minister and author, founded the Christian Research Institute (d. 1989)
  1928   – Jean Vanier, Canadian philosopher and humanitarian, founded L'Arche (d. 2019)
1929 – Michel Bélanger, Canadian businessman and banker (d. 1997)
  1929   – John Golding, English historian, scholar, and curator (d. 2012)
  1929   – Arnold Palmer, American golfer and businessman (d. 2016)
1930 – Aino Kukk, Estonian chess player and engineer (d. 2006)
1931 – Isabel Colegate, English author and agent
  1931   – Philip Baker Hall, American actor (d. 2022)
1932 – Bo Goldman, American playwright, screenwriter, and producer
1933 – Yevgeny Khrunov, Russian colonel and cosmonaut (d. 2000)
  1933   – Karl Lagerfeld, German-French fashion designer and photographer (d. 2019)
1934 – Charles Kuralt, American journalist (d. 1997)
  1934   – Roger Maris, American baseball player and coach (d. 1985)
  1934   – Jim Oberstar, American educator and politician (d. 2014)
  1934   – Larry Sitsky, Australian pianist, composer, and educator
  1934   – Mr. Wrestling II, American wrestler (d. 2020)
1935 – Mary Oliver, American poet (d. 2019)
1937 – Jared Diamond, American biologist, geographer, and author
  1937   – Tommy Overstreet, American singer-songwriter and guitarist (d. 2015)
1938 – David Hamilton, English radio and television host
1940 – Roy Ayers, American singer-songwriter, keyboard player, vibraphonist, and producer
  1940   – Buck Buchanan, American football player (d. 1992)
  1940   – Bob Chance, American baseball player (d. 2013)
1941 – Stephen Jay Gould, American paleontologist, biologist, and author (d. 2002)
  1941   – Christopher Hogwood, English harpsichord player and conductor, founded the Academy of Ancient Music (d. 2014)
  1941   – Gunpei Yokoi, Japanese video game designer, invented Game Boy (d. 1997)
1942 – Danny Hutton, Irish-American singer 
1944 – Thomas Allen, English actor, singer, and academic
1945 – José Feliciano, Puerto Rican singer-songwriter and guitarist
  1945   – Gerard Henderson, Australian journalist and author
  1945   – Mike Mullane, American colonel and astronaut
1946 – Michèle Alliot-Marie, French lawyer and politician, French Minister of Foreign and European Affairs
  1946   – Jim Hines, American sprinter and football player
  1946   – Don Powell, English rock drummer
  1946   – Patrick Norman, Canadian singer-songwriter
1947 – Larry Nelson, American golfer
  1947   – David Pountney, English director and manager
1948 – Zhang Chengzhi, Chinese historian and author
  1948   – Brian Donohoe, Scottish politician
  1948   – Judy Geeson, English actress
  1948   – Bob Lanier, American basketball player and coach  (d. 2022)
  1948   – Margaret Trudeau, Canadian actress and talk show host, 12th Spouse of the Prime Minister of Canada
  1948   – Charlie Waters, American football player, coach, and radio host
1949 – Barriemore Barlow, English rock drummer and songwriter
  1949   – Babette Cole, English author and illustrator (d. 2017)
  1949   – Don Muraco, American wrestler
  1949   – Bill O'Reilly, American journalist and author
1950 – Rosie Flores, American singer and guitarist 
  1950   – Tom Lund, Norwegian football player 
  1950   – Joe Perry, American singer-songwriter and guitarist 
1951 – Sarah Coakley, English philosopher, theologian, and academic
  1951   – Steve Keirn, American wrestler
  1951   – Bill Rogers, American golfer
1952 – Medea Benjamin, American activist, founder of Code Pink
  1952   – Vic Toews, Paraguayan-Canadian lawyer and politician, 48th Canadian Minister of Justice
1953 – Amy Irving, American actress 
  1953   – Pat Cadigan, American science fiction author
  1953   – John Thurso, Scottish businessman and politician
1954 – Jackie Ashley, English journalist
  1954   – Lorely Burt, English politician
  1954   – Don Wilson, American kickboxer and actor
1955 – Pat Mastelotto, American rock drummer
1956 – Johnnie Fingers, Irish keyboard player and songwriter
1957 – Kate Burton, Swiss-born British actress
  1957   – Carol Decker, English singer-songwriter
1958 – Chris Columbus, American director, producer, and screenwriter
  1958   – Siobhan Fahey, Irish singer-songwriter and producer 
1959 – Michael Earl, American actor, singer, and puppeteer (d. 2015)
1960 – Alison Bechdel, American author and illustrator
  1960   – Margaret Ferrier, Scottish politician
  1960   – Colin Firth, English actor and producer
  1960   – Tim Hunter, Canadian ice hockey player and coach
  1960   – David Lowery, American singer-songwriter and guitarist
1963 – Randy Johnson, American baseball player and actor
  1963   – Bill Stevenson, American drummer, songwriter, and producer 
1964 – John E. Sununu, American engineer and politician
1966 – Yuki Saito, Japanese singer and actress
  1966   – Joe Nieuwendyk, Canadian ice hockey player and manager
1968 – Andreas Herzog, Austrian footballer and manager
  1968   – Big Daddy Kane, American rapper, producer, and actor 
  1968   – Guy Ritchie, English director, producer, and screenwriter
1969 – Craig Innes, New Zealand rugby player
  1969   – Johnathon Schaech, American actor, producer, and screenwriter
1970 – Ménélik, Cameroonian-French rapper
  1970   – Dean Gorré, Surinamese footballer and manager
  1970   – Paula Kelley, American singer-songwriter 
  1970   – Neera Tanden, American lawyer and policy analyst
1971 – Joe Bravo, American jockey
1972 – James Duval, American actor and producer
  1972   – Bente Skari, Norwegian skier
1973 – Ferdinand Coly, Senegalese footballer
  1973   – Mark Huizinga, Dutch martial artist
  1973   – Tim Stimpson, English rugby player
1974 – Mohammad Akram, Pakistani cricketer and coach
  1974   – Mirko Filipović, Croatian mixed martial artist, boxer, and politician
  1974   – Ryan Phillippe, American actor and producer
  1974   – Ben Wallace, American basketball player
1975 – Dan O'Toole, Canadian sportscaster
  1975   – Melanie Pullen, American photographer
1976 – Marty Holah, New Zealand rugby player 
  1976   – Gustavo Kuerten, Brazilian tennis player
  1976   – Vassilis Lakis, Greek footballer
  1976   – Matt Morgan, American wrestler
  1976   – Reinder Nummerdor, Dutch volleyball player
1977 – Mike DiBiase, American wrestler
  1977   – Caleb Ralph, New Zealand rugby player
1978 – Julia Goldsworthy, English politician
  1978   – Alex Horne, British comedian 
  1978   – Ramūnas Šiškauskas, Lithuanian basketball player
1980 – Roger Mason Jr., American basketball player
  1980   – Trevor Murdoch, American wrestler
  1980   – Mikey Way, American bass player and songwriter 
1981 – Marco Chiudinelli, Swiss tennis player
  1981   – Germán Denis, Argentinian footballer
  1981   – Bonnie Maxon, American wrestler
1982 – Misty Copeland, American ballerina and author
  1982   – Javi Varas, Spanish footballer
1983 – Fernando Belluschi, Argentinian footballer
  1983   – Shawn James, Guyanese-American basketball player
  1983   – Jérémy Toulalan, French footballer
  1983   – Joey Votto, Canadian baseball player
1984 – Sander Post, Estonian footballer
  1984   – Harry Treadaway, English actor
  1984   – Luke Treadaway, English actor
  1984   – Drake Younger, American wrestler
1985 – Aleksandrs Čekulajevs, Latvian footballer
  1985   – James Graham, English rugby league player
  1985   – Neil Walker, American baseball player
1986 – Ashley Monroe, American singer-songwriter 
  1986   – Eoin Morgan, Irish- English cricketer
1987 – Paul Goldschmidt, American baseball player
  1987   – Nana Tanimura, Japanese singer-songwriter and actress
  1987   – Alex Saxon, American actor
1988 – Bobby Sharp, Canadian wrestler
  1988   – Jordan Staal, Canadian ice hockey player
1989 – Manish Pandey, Indian cricketer
  1989   – Matt Ritchie, English footballer
  1989   – Lee Sawyer, English footballer
1991 – Boadu Maxwell Acosty, Ghanaian footballer
1992 – Ricky Ledo, American basketball player
  1992   – Ayub Masika, Kenyan footballer
1993 – Sam Kerr, Australian footballer
1994 – Mohamed Sylla, French rapper
1997 – Brooke Henderson, Canadian golfer
1998 – Anna Blinkova, Russian tennis player
1999 – Laura Taylor, Australian swimmer

Deaths

Pre-1600
210 BC – Qin Shi Huang, first emperor of China (b. 260 BC)
 602 – Dugu Qieluo, empress of the Chinese Sui dynasty (b. 544)
 689 – Guo Zhengyi, official of the Chinese Tang Dynasty
 710 – Li Chongfu, imperial prince of the Chinese Tang Dynasty (b. c.  680)
 918 – Baldwin II, Frankish margrave (b. c. 865)
 952 – Gao Xingzhou, Chinese general (b. 885)
 954 – Louis IV, king of West Francia (b. 920)
1167 – Matilda of England, Holy Roman Empress (b. 1102)
1197 – Henry II, Count of Champagne (b. 1166)
1217 – William de Redvers, 5th Earl of Devon, English politician
1281 – John II, Margrave of Brandenburg-Stendal (b. 1237)
1306 – Nicholas of Tolentino, Italian mystic and saint (b. 1245)
1308 – Emperor Go-Nijō of Japan (b. 1285)
1364 – Robert of Taranto, King of Albania
1382 – Louis I of Hungary (b. 1326)
1384 – Joanna of Dreux, Countess of Penthievre and Duchess of Brittany (b. 1319)
1419 – John the Fearless, Duke of Burgundy (b. 1371)
1479 – Jacopo Piccolomini-Ammannati, Italian cardinal and humanist (b. 1422)
1482 – Federico da Montefeltro, Italian warlord (b. 1422)
1504 – Philibert II, Duke of Savoy (b. 1480)
1519 – John Colet, English theologian and scholar (b. 1467)
1549 – Anthony Denny, English politician (b. 1501)
1591 – Richard Grenville, English admiral and politician (b. 1542)

1601–1900
1604 – William Morgan, Welsh bishop and translator (b. 1545)
1607 – Luzzasco Luzzaschi, Italian organist and composer (b. 1545)
1669 – Henrietta Maria of France, Queen of England, Scotland and Ireland (b. 1609)
1676 – Gerrard Winstanley, English activist (b. 1609)
1748 – Ignacia del Espíritu Santo, Filipino nun, founded the Religious of the Virgin Mary (b. 1663)
1749 – Émilie du Châtelet, French mathematician and physicist (b. 1706)
1759 – Ferdinand Konščak, Croatian missionary and explorer (b. 1703)
1797 – Mary Wollstonecraft, English philosopher, historian, and novelist (b. 1759)
1842 – William Hobson, Irish-New Zealand soldier and politician, 1st Governor of New Zealand (b. 1792)
  1842   – Letitia Christian Tyler, American wife of John Tyler, 11th First Lady of the United States (b. 1790)
1851 – Thomas Hopkins Gallaudet, American minister and educator (b. 1787)
1867 – Simon Sechter, Austrian organist, composer, and conductor (b. 1788)
1889 – Charles III, Prince of Monaco (b. 1818)
1891 – David Humphreys Storer, American physician and naturalist (b. 1804)
1898 – Empress Elisabeth of Austria (b. 1837)

1901–present
1905 – Pete Browning, American baseball player (b. 1861)
1915 – Charles Boucher de Boucherville, Canadian physician and politician, 3rd Premier of Quebec (b. 1822)
  1915   – Bagha Jatin, Indian philosopher and author (b. 1879 )
1919 – J. F. Archibald, Australian journalist and publisher, founded the Archibald Prize (b. 1856)
1922 – Wilfrid Scawen Blunt, English poet and activist (b. 1840)
1923 – Sukumar Ray, Indian poet and playwright (b. 1887)
1931 – Dmitri Egorov, Russian mathematician and academic (b. 1869)
  1931   – Salvatore Maranzano, Italian-American gangster (b. 1886)
1933 – Giuseppe Campari, Italian race car driver (b. 1892)
1933 – Baconin Borzacchini, Italian race car driver (b. 1898)
1933 – Stanisław Czaykowski, Polish race car driver (b. 1899)
1934 – George Henschel, German-English pianist, composer, and conductor (b. 1850)
1935 – Huey Long, American lawyer and politician, 40th Governor of Louisiana (b. 1893)
1937 – Sergei Tretyakov, Russian author and playwright (b. 1892)
1938 – Charles Cruft, English businessman, founded Crufts (b. 1852)
1939 – Wilhelm Fritz von Roettig, German general (b. 1888)
1948 – Ferdinand I of Bulgaria (b. 1861)
1952 – Youssef Aftimus, Lebanese engineer and architect, designed the Beirut City Hall (b. 1866)
1954 – Peter Anders, German tenor and actor (b. 1908)
1961 – Leo Carrillo, American actor and singer (b. 1880)
  1961   – Wolfgang von Trips, German race car driver (b. 1928)
1965 – Father Divine, American spiritual leader (b. 1880)
1966 – Emil Julius Gumbel, German mathematician and statistician (b. 1891)
1968 – Erna Mohr, German zoologist (b. 1894)
1971 – Pier Angeli, Italian-American actress and singer (b. 1932)
1973 – Cornelia Meigs, American author and playwright (b. 1884)
1975 – Hans Swarowsky, Hungarian-Austrian conductor and educator (b. 1899)
  1975   – George Paget Thomson, English physicist and academic, Nobel Prize laureate (b. 1892)
1976 – Dalton Trumbo, American screenwriter and novelist (b. 1905)
1979 – Agostinho Neto, Angolan politician, 1st President of Angola (b. 1922)
1983 – Felix Bloch, Swiss-American physicist and academic, Nobel Prize laureate (b. 1905)
  1983   – Norah Lofts, English author (b. 1904)
  1983   – Jon Brower Minnoch, American heaviest man (b. 1941)
  1983   – B. J. Vorster, South African lawyer and politician, 4th State President of South Africa (b. 1915)
1985 – Ernst Öpik, Estonian astronomer and astrophysicist (b. 1893)
  1985   – Jock Stein, Scottish footballer and manager (b. 1922)
1987 – Boris Rõtov, Estonian chess player (b. 1937)
1988 – Virginia Satir, American psychotherapist and author (b. 1916)
1991 – Jack Crawford, Australian tennis player (b. 1908)
1994 – Charles Drake, American actor (b. 1917)
1996 – Joanne Dru, American actress (b. 1922)
  1996   – Hans List, Austrian scientist and inventor (b. 1896)
2000 – Zaib-un-Nissa Hamidullah, Indian-Pakistani journalist and author (b. 1921)
2004 – Brock Adams, American soldier, lawyer, and politician, 5th United States Secretary of Transportation (b. 1927)
2005 – Hermann Bondi, Austrian mathematician and cosmologist (b. 1919)
  2005   – Clarence "Gatemouth" Brown, American singer and guitarist (b. 1924)
2006 – Patty Berg, American golfer (b. 1918)
  2006   – Tāufaʻāhau Tupou IV, Tongan king (b. 1918)
2007 – Anita Roddick, English businesswoman, founded The Body Shop (b. 1942)
  2007   – Joe Sherlock, Irish politician (b. 1930)
  2007   – Ted Stepien, American businessman (b. 1925)
  2007   – Jane Wyman, American actress (b. 1917)
2008 – Gérald Beaudoin, Canadian lawyer and politician (b. 1929)
  2008   – Vernon Handley, English conductor (b. 1930)
2011 – Cliff Robertson, American actor (b. 1923)
2012 – Raquel Correa, Chilean journalist (b. 1934)
  2012   – Robert Gammage, American captain, lawyer, and politician (b. 1938)
  2012   – Lance LeGault, American actor and stuntman (b. 1935)
  2012   – Stanley Long, English director, producer, cinematographer, and screenwriter (b. 1933)
  2012   – John Moffatt, English actor and playwright (b. 1922)
2013 – John Hambrick, American journalist and actor (b. 1940)
  2013   – Ibrahim Makhous, Syrian politician, Syrian Minister of Foreign Affairs (b. 1925)
  2013   – Josef Němec, Czech boxer (b. 1933)
  2013   – E. Clay Shaw, Jr., American accountant and politician (b. 1939)
  2013   – Jack Vance, Canadian general (b. 1933)
2014 – Emilio Botín, Spanish banker and businessman (b. 1934)
  2014   – Richard Kiel, American actor (b. 1939)
  2014   – Edward Nelson, American mathematician and academic (b. 1932)
  2014   – George Spencer, American baseball player (b. 1926)
  2014   – Paul K. Sybrowsky, American religious leader and academic (b. 1944)
2015 – Norman Farberow, American psychologist and academic (b. 1918)
  2015   – Adrian Frutiger, Swiss typeface designer (b. 1928)
  2015   – Antoine Lahad, Lebanese general (b. 1927)
2020 – Diana Rigg, British actress (b. 1938)

Holidays and observances
 Amerindian Heritage Day (Guyana)
 Children's Day (Honduras)
 Christian feast day:
 Alexander Crummell (Episcopal Church)
 Aubert
 Blessed Thomas Tsugi, Charles Spinola, and Great Martyrs of Nagasaki
 Edmund James Peck (Anglican Church of Canada)
 Nicholas of Tolentino
 Theodard of Maastricht
 September 10 (Eastern Orthodox liturgics)
 Gibraltar National Day
 Saint George's Caye Day (Belize)
 Teachers' Day (China)
 World Suicide Prevention Day

References

External links

 
 
 

Days of the year
September